De Dana Dan (Hit Left and Right) is a 2009 Indian Hindi-language comedy film directed by Priyadarshan. Its story is a partial adaptation of the Hollywood film Screwed; some scenes were taken from Vettam, Priyadarshan's Malayalam film. The film has an ensemble cast led by Akshay Kumar, Sunil Shetty, Katrina Kaif, Paresh Rawal and Sameera Reddy. Filming began on 1 December 2008 at Mehboob Studio in Mumbai. Released on 27 November 2009, it was moderately successful at the box office.

Plot
Nitin Bankar is a servant and driver for Kuljeet Kaur. Kuljeet owns malls, restaurants, and other real estate in Singapore. Nitin dislikes Kuljeet's dog, Moolchand Ji, who gets him in trouble. Ram Mishra works for a courier service after moving to Singapore to work in Chinese films. Anjali Kakkad is in love with Nitin, and Manpreet Oberoi is in love with Ram. Both girlfriends are wealthy, and accustomed to the good life.

Inspector Wilson Parera is investigating Harbans Chadda for cheque kiting. Harbans wants to marry off his son, Nonny, so he can obtain a dowry and pay his debts. He agrees to Nonny's marriage to Anjali after her father, Himanshu (Tinu Anand), brings up the subject. At a restaurant, Harbans misses meeting Anjali because Wilson is there;  Himanshu meets Pammi Chadda, Harbans' younger second wife. Anjali tells Nonny that she is pregnant with her lover's child to gert out of the wedding, since she loves Nitin.

At a casino Harbans meets Brij Mohan Oberoi, who introduces Indian ambassador Paramjeet Singh Lamba (Vikram Gokhale) to everyone there. After learning about Oberoi's wealth, Harbans arranges Nonny's marriage to Manpreet. Himanshu, who was not informed, arranges Anjali's marriage to someone else. Moosa Heerapoorwala decides to marry Anu Chopra, a dancer at the casino. After his brother-in-law finds out, he hires Mafia don Maamu to kill Moosa. Maamu sends Kaala Krishna Murali (Johnny Lever), his best assassin, to do the job. To hide from his wife, Moosa books a hotel room as Subair.

Nitin and Ram decide to kidnap Moolchand Ji, the only living thing Kuljeet loves. When they reach the hotel, they realise that the dog has escaped and the police think that Nitin has been kidnapped. Anjali runs away from home and goes to their room. Kuljeet initially refuses to pay the ransom, but relents when her customers stage a boycott. Nitin does not want to return to Kuljeet, so they decide to obtain a dead body from Maamu and throw it onto the railway tracks with Nitin's driving licence to suggest that the kidnappers killed Nitin.

Harbans' and Oberoi's families come to the hotel for the wedding, and Harbans and Oberoi take a photo to celebrate their families' union. Nitin waits at the hotel entrance with a white orchid on his hand for Maamu's man to come for the advance money. Himanshu arrives at the hotel and chases Nitin into Harbans' room. Nitin, unable to hide under the bed, hides in a wardrobe. Harbans locks his cellphone (and Nitin) in the wardrobe. Himanshu mistakes Nitin's room for Lamba's, and attacks him and his wife.

Nitin calls Ram and tells him to give an advance to Maamu's man, but Ram mistakenly gives it to Kaala. Nonny sees Anjali, and her father agrees to return their money. Harbans mistakes Anu for Anjali, which causes confusion. Moosa's photo is exchanged with Oberoi's, so Kaala tries to kill Oberoi. Pammi demands money from Harbans to buy clothing and jewellery, but wants to elope with Arjun. Harbans asks her to take money from Lamba, and she mistakes Moosa for Lamba. Moosa tries to molest Pammi, which makes Harbans angry with Lamba. Anu mistakes Lamba for Moosa and tries to get close to her; after getting caught, she says that Lamba promised to marry her or give her money.

Wilson reaches Harbans' room with Lamba's help and looks for Harbans. He opens the wardrobe, finds Nitin, and mistakes him for Harbans. Trying to kill Oberoi, Kaala falls onto Ram's and Nitin's truck with which they are pick uping the ransom. Nitin is left behind and brought to the hospital; Ram gets the money and reaches the hotel, and Kaala is assumed to be the kidnapper (since he was on the truck). Maamu arrives at the hotel with a body that nobody wants, saying that Harbans ordered him to kill Oberoi.

Kaala plants a bomb in the hotel water tank; the explosion bursts the tank and causes a flood. Nitin, Anjali, Ram and Manpreet, unable to find the money, decide to separate; Nitin then sees the suitcase, recognizes it as Kuljeet's, and calls the other three.

Cast
Akshay Kumar as Nitin Bankar
Suniel Shetty as Ram Mishra 
Katrina Kaif as Anjali Kakkad, Nitin's love interest
Sameera Reddy as Manpreet Oberoi, Ram's love interest
Paresh Rawal as Harbans Chaddha, Nonny's father and Pammi's husband
Tinnu Anand as Himanshu Kakkad, Anjali's father
Neha Dhupia as Anu Chopra,  a casino dancer
Rajpal Yadav as Dagdu Yadav, a waiter
Manoj Joshi as Brijmohan Oberoi, Manpreet's father
Archana Puran Singh as Kuljeet Kaur
Aditi Govitrikar as Pammi Chadda, Harbans' second wife and Nonny's step-mother
Asrani as Maamu Lee Chan, a ruthless crime boss
Chunky Pandey as Nonny Chadda, Harbans' son
Johnny Lever as Kaala Krishna Murari, Maamu's henchman
Shakti Kapoor as Moosa Hirapurwala / Subair Ahmed, Anu's love interest
Vikram Gokhale as Paramjeet Singh Lamba, Kamini's husband and the Indian ambassador
 Supriya Karnik as Kamini Lamba, Oberoi's sister and Lamba's wife
Sharat Saxena as CBI Inspector Wilson Perera
Archana Suseelan as the hotel receptionist
 Satish Nagpal as the hotel manager

Production

De Dana Dan reunited Akshay Kumar, Sunil Shetty and Paresh Rawal with Priyadarshan, who directed them in the first Hera Pheri film. It was the first time the trio acted together after Phir Hera Pheri in 2006, although Rawal and Shetty appeared in Priyadarshan's Hulchul and Chup Chup Ke. Akshay and Rawal also appeared in Priyadarshan's Bhagam Bhag and Garam Masala. Asin Thottumkal was approached for Katrina's role, but turned it down due to little screen time.

Nitin Bankar and Ram Mishra, played by Akshay Kumar and Sunil Shetty respectively, are names of long-lasting spot-boys; Nitin Bankar is Akshay's spot-boy, and Ram Mishra is that of Sunil. The film took 80 days to complete.

Release

Box office
De Dana Dan earned  in its opening weekend in India, the tenth-biggest opening weekend of all time when it was released.

It debuted in ninth place in the UK, earning £ (about ) on 48 screens in its opening weekend; the per-screen average was £6,417. The film debuted in 20th place in the US, earning $ (about ) on 69 screens in its opening weekend; the per-screen average was $11,194. It debuted in 12th place in Australia, earning $96,597 (about ) on 14 screens in its opening weekend; the per-screen average was $6,900. The film earned £ at the end of its UK run, and $944,979 at the end of its US run; at the end of its Australian run, it collected $.

Critical response

The film received mixed reviews from critics, who praised its performances, humor, cinematography, climax visuals and score and criticised its screenplay, narration and pace.

Home media
De Dana Dan was released on DVD, with a running time of 167 minutes.

Soundtrack

Theme song
"Paisa Paisa" ("Tu, paisa paisa karti hai, tu paise pe kyun marti hai") is the film's theme song. It was produced by Pritam, composed and sung by RDB, and performed by Akshay Kumar and Katrina Kaif.

The song was conceived to illustrate that money was the driving force of the film's plot. It incorporated comedic lyrics with sound effects and a "slight R&B touch", making it upbeat, danceable, and memorable. Sung by Punjabi singer Manak-e, it was composed for De Dana Dan by RDB; the rest of its music was composed by Pritam. The music is based on "Yeah", Usher's hit song. Originally sung by Manak-e in Punjabi several years earlier on his album, Akshay Kumar asked for the song to be re-composed and re-released with Hindi and Punjabi lyrics by RDB. "Paisa Paisa" was chosen as the film's theme song because it was light and upbeat.

Reception
The Times of India reported in late November 2009 that the song (released before De Dana Dan) was gaining attention and "rocking the charts". Before the film's release, it was considered one of its "fast catching numbers" and a version was used in the Jharkhand election campaign. According to Glamsham, Paisa Paisa" from De Dana Dan is a chartbuster and is igniting the music charts." In December 2009, Daily News & Analysis reported that "Paisa Paisa" was favoured to be popular during party season. It was later reported that although De Dana Dan did not do as well as expected at the box office, "Paisa Paisa" helped locate a lost, mentally-challenged child when police were informed that the child continually hummed the song.

References

External links
 
 

2009 films
2000s Hindi-language films
Films shot in Singapore
Films directed by Priyadarshan
Indian slapstick comedy films
Films featuring songs by Pritam
2009 comedy films
Hindi remakes of Malayalam films